The Tomb of Ratu Mas Malang (Indonesian: Makam Ratu Mas Malang) is a tomb and cultural site located in near the village of Plered in the Bantul Regency of Indonesia. It is the tomb of Queen Malang, one of the wives of Amangkurat I of Mataram. The tomb was built using white stone, and construction finished in 1668. The tomb has since been damaged by environmental factors.

References 

Tombs in Indonesia